Mark "Gordon" Robinson (born January 21, 1989) is an American drummer and business owner. Robinson played drums with notable acts as the Jonas Brothers, Kenny Chesney and Keith Urban. He is currently the CEO and owner of Storyboard, LLC. based in Atlanta, Ga.

Life and career
At an early age, Mark had many music industry connections through a variety of people and bands. From 2002–2004, he attended Eastern Christian High School with Kevin Jonas of the Jonas Brothers. From 2004–2008, Robinson played in a variety of Christian music scenes in the Chicago area, even playing with his own band around town. In 2009, he played with Kenny Chesney and Keith Urban at Soldier Field during their 2009 Summer Tour. Opening artists included; LeAnn Rimes, Gary Allen, and Lady Antebellum.

In 2013, Mark started Storyboard, LLC., a tri-venture company out of Atlanta, Ga. Storyboard, LLC. focus' on local music lessons, hosts interviews of upcoming and underground artists for Storyboard's online channel and even houses an independent record label.

He joined the band Revel In Romance in 2014.

Personal life
Robinson was born in Minot, North Dakota and early on moved to Palatine, Illinois. In 2002 he moved to Wyckoff, New Jersey where he attended Eastern Christian High School with Kevin Jonas. He has two brothers, one older, Phil, and Tim is his younger brother. He graduated from William Fremd High School in Palatine, Illinois in 2007.

References

External links

1989 births
American drummers
Universal Records artists
Living people
People from Palatine, Illinois
21st-century American drummers